Young Women's Christian Association, also known as the Elkhart Y.W.C.A. and Lexington House, is a historic YWCA located at Elkhart, Elkhart County, Indiana.  It was built in 1919, and is a three-story, brick building on a raised basement and Bungalow / American Craftsman style design elements.  It measures approximately 40 feet wide and 150 feet deep.  It has a flat roof and arched openings on the first floor.

It was added to the National Register of Historic Places in 1991. It is located in the Elkhart Downtown Commercial Historic District.

References

Clubhouses on the National Register of Historic Places in Indiana
Buildings and structures completed in 1919
Buildings and structures in Elkhart, Indiana
National Register of Historic Places in Elkhart County, Indiana
Historic district contributing properties in Indiana